Chandigarh Football Association (CFA) is the state governing body of football in Chandigarh. It is affiliated with the All India Football Federation, the national governing body.

References

Football in Chandigarh
Football governing bodies in India
Organisations based in Chandigarh